Louis Mottiat (6 July 1889 – 5 June 1972) was a Belgian professional road bicycle racer. Mottiat was born in Bouffioulx, and because of his endurance was nicknamed 'the iron man'. His career was interrupted by World War I. He died in Gilly, aged 82.

Major results

1910
Brussels-Paris
1911
Paris-Calais
1912
Tour de France: Winner stage 10
1913
Bordeaux–Paris
1914
Tour of Belgium, including 4 stages
Paris–Brussels
1920
 Critérium des As (Bordeaux–Paris-Bordeaux)
Tour of Belgium, including 3 stages
Tour de France
 Winner stage 1
 Wearing yellow jersey for one day
1921
Liège–Bastogne–Liège
Tour de France:
 11th place overall classification
 Winner stages 1, 4, 5 and 7
 Wearing yellow jersey for one day
Paris–Brest–Paris
1922
Engis
Gembloux
Liège–Bastogne–Liège
1924
Paris–Tours
Tour de France:
 Winner stage 8
1925
Tour de France:
 Winner stage 3

External links 

Belgian male cyclists
1889 births
1972 deaths
Belgian Tour de France stage winners
People from Châtelet
Cyclists from Hainaut (province)